The following is a list of all team-to-team transactions that have occurred in the National Hockey League during the 1986–87 NHL season. It lists what team each player has been traded to, signed by, or claimed by, and for which player(s) or draft pick(s), if applicable.

Trades between teams

May

June

July

August

September 

  The condition – the Rangers receives a 3rd-rd pick if MacLellan scores 25 or more goals in the 1986-87 season or a 4th-rd pick if less than 25 goals.

October

November

December

January

February

March 
 Trading Deadline: March 10, 1987

April

References

Additional sources
 hockeydb.com - search for player and select "show trades"
 

National Hockey League transactions
1986–87 NHL season